Paul Corrigan may refer to:

Paul Corrigan (political adviser) (born 1948), Director of Strategy and Commissioning of the NHS London Strategic Health Authority
Paul Corrigan (footballer) (born 1977), Australian rules footballer for Geelong and current Essendon development coach
Paul Corrigan, American television writer and producer, see Modern Family
Paul Corrigan (actor), English actor, see List of former EastEnders characters